The Girl on the Front Page is a 1936 American comedy crime film directed by Harry Beaumont and starring Edmund Lowe, Gloria Stuart and Reginald Owen. It was produced and distributed by Hollywood major Universal Pictures.

Synopsis
After inheriting a newspaper from her father, the socialite Joan Langford clashes with the managing editor Hank Gilman. He is a hard-bitten newsman who resents her interference in the running of the paper. Disguising herself as an aspiring young journalist, she gets a job at the paper. Although Gilman is in fact well aware of who she is and assigns her to very difficult assignments to convince her that the newspaper business is not for her. However she eventually gains his respect, and together they thwart an attempt at blackmail by Langford's British butler who is revealed to be the head of a society of criminal servants.

Main cast
 Edmund Lowe as Hank Gilman  
 Gloria Stuart as Joan Langford  
 Reginald Owen as Archie Biddle  
 Spring Byington as Mrs. Langford  
 Gilbert Emery as Thorne  
 David Oliver as Flash  
 Robert Gleckler as Bill  
 Phillip Trent as Edward  
 Maxine Reiner as Annette

References

Bibliography
 Gates, Phillipa. Detecting Women: Gender and the Hollywood Detective Film. SUNY Press, 2011.

External links
 

1936 films
1930s crime comedy films
American crime comedy films
Films directed by Harry Beaumont
Universal Pictures films
Films scored by Heinz Roemheld
American black-and-white films
1936 comedy films
1930s English-language films
1930s American films